The Iranian embassy bombing was a double suicide bombing that occurred in front of the Iranian embassy in Beirut, Lebanon on 19 November 2013. The two bombings resulted in 23 deaths and injured at least 160 others.

Background
The bombings were seen as part of the spillover of the Syrian civil war, in which Hezbollah and Iran have supported the Syrian government, while the Abdullah Azzam Brigades have fought against the Syrian government. On the same day as the bombing, Syrian government forces seized the town of Qarah from rebel fighters in an opening action in the Battle of Qalamoun.

The Syrian government effort at the time to eliminate the rebel stronghold in Qalamoun, a region along the Lebanese border with strong ties to the Lebanese Sunni town of Arsal, with strong support of Hezbollah fighters, was expected by some analysts to raise tensions within Lebanon.

Bombings
The area immediately outside the embassy gates was hit by two consecutive blasts. The first was reported to be carried out by a bomber either on a motorcycle or on foot. After people had rushed to the scene, a 4x4 vehicle two buildings away from the embassy blew up in a second, deadlier explosion. The two blasts occurred within 2 minutes of each other. Six buildings were reported to have been damaged. The bombs destroyed some building fronts and severely damaged the embassy gates, but caused only fairly minor damage to the embassy building.

Victims
According to Lebanon's Health Ministry at least 23 people were killed and 147 wounded. Iranian cultural attaché Ebrahim Ansari was among the dead, with five Iranian security personnel wounded. Ansari and the Iranian ambassador Ghazanfar Roknabadi were scheduled to leave the embassy to attend a meeting at the Ministry of Culture at around the time when the bombs went off. The embassy's head of security, a Lebanese national, was also killed in the blast.

Claims of responsibility
The Abdullah Azzam Brigades, a Sunni Islamist militant group, claimed responsibility for the attack. The group declared that its attacks against Iran would continue until Iran "withdraws its forces from Syria". The group has made false claims in the past. On 31 December, sources confirmed that Lebanese authorities have captured Majid bin Mohammad al-Majid, the Saudi leader of the Abdullah Azzam Brigades.

Leader of Hezbollah Hassan Nasrallah said in December television interview that the attack was "linked to the Saudi intelligence services" because of "Saudi Arabia's rage against Iran over (Saudi Arabia's) failure" in Syria.

Reactions
Domestic
Hezbollah held a public funeral and rally in Beirut the day after the attack. Hezbollah deputy leader Naim Qassem vowed to continue support for the Syrian government in saying the attacks in Lebanon were "inevitable pains on the road to victory", while mourners chanted "Death to America, Israel, and the takfiris!"

Regional
Iranian foreign ministry spokeswoman Marzieh Afkham blamed Israel for the attack, calling it "an inhuman crime and spiteful act done by Zionists and their mercenaries". Israel denied any involvement.

Saudi Arabia called on all its citizens to leave the country.

Other states and entities
The attacks were condemned by the United Nations Security Council, China, France, Syria, the United Kingdom and the United States. Tom Fletcher, the British ambassador to Beirut, personally donated blood and expressed solidarity with those affected.

See also

 Iran–Lebanon relations
 List of attacks on diplomatic missions
 1983 United States embassy bombing
 Iranians in Lebanon
 Ghazanfar Roknabadi

References

External links
 Iranian embassy in Lebanon 

2013 in Lebanon
Attacks on diplomatic missions of Iran
Attacks on diplomatic missions in Lebanon
Terrorist incidents in Lebanon during the Syrian civil war
Car and truck bombings in Lebanon
Iran–Lebanon relations
Mass murder in 2013
Suicide bombings in Lebanon
Terrorist incidents in Lebanon in 2013
Terrorist incidents in Beirut
2010s in Beirut
Building bombings in Lebanon
November 2013 events in Lebanon